Cratosolpuga is an extinct genus of solifuge from the Early Cretaceous Araripe Basin of Brazil. It contains the single species Cratosolpuga wunderlichi. The genus is known from and named after the Crato Formation.

References 

Extinct arachnids
Solifugae genera
Aptian life
Early Cretaceous animals of South America
Cretaceous Brazil
Fossils of Brazil
 
Fossil taxa described in 1996